Oakton may refer to:


Places

United States
Oakton, Georgia , a place in Georgia
Oakton, Kentucky, on Kentucky Route 58
Oakton, Missouri
Oakton, Virginia

Fictional
Oakton, the fictional setting of The Nut Job

Other uses
 Eric Oakton (1906–1981), English footballer
 Oakton Community College, Des Plaines and Skokie, Illinois
 Oakton High School, Fairfax County, Virginia

See also
 Oakton–Skokie station, Skokie, Illiniois
 
 Oaktown (disambiguation)